Annville is an unincorporated community, a census-designated place (CDP), and the largest community in Jackson County, KY. As of the 2020 census, the population was 1,102. The community was established in 1878 and named for local resident Nancy Ann Johnson. The community offers a few services such as a post office, grocery store, gas station, medical clinic, nursing home, restaurants, and other locally owned businesses.

Geography & Transportation
Annville is located in southern Jackson County, along KY Route 3630. 

According to the United States Census Bureau, the Annville CDP has a total area of 8.0 square miles, of which 0.4 square miles, or 0.55%, are water. Pond Creek flows through the southern part of the community, running southwest to the South Fork of the Rockcastle River, part of the Cumberland River watershed.

Public parks 

 Worthington Park

Major routes 

 KY Route 3630
 KY Route 30
 KY Route 290

Kentucky Route 3630 is the main road through the community. Kentucky Route 290 goes north from town 9 miles to McKee, the county's seat. South of community is Kentucky Route 30 which bypasses the community as a recently constructed highway and acts as the county's main east-west corridor, connecting the community to London, 15 miles to the southwest.

History

Establishment 
The town's first post office was opened in 1878, named Chinquapin Rough, for the numerous chinquapin and dwarf chestnut trees found along Pond Creek. In 1886 the post office was renamed Annville for resident Nancy Ann Johnson. Annville was incorporated in 1988 and dissolved in 2000.

Annville Institute 
In 1909, Rev. William Worthington decided to locate a Reformed Church College in Jackson County, KY. His vision was for some sort of technical school to help promote his vision of "complete living for the mountain people." The beautiful property with its rolling hills and large meadows was purchased and the Annville Institute started that Fall and has served the community in multiple facets ever since. Although the Annville Institute no longer operates as a school, it still benefits the community through its numerous outreach program and facilities.

Lincoln Hall 

Lincoln Hall served as the main classroom for the Annville Institute. The original Lincoln Hall was destroyed by fire in 1921. The present building was built in 1922 and 1923 on the foundation of the original building. After the Institute ceased its educational operations in 1978, the building has primarily served as a community center, with no true purpose.

Economy 
The Jackson County Industrial Development Authority (JCIDA) assists with economic development efforts in the county. The authority manages 3 industrial parks in the county including the Jackson County Regional Industrial Park which is located in Annville.
Major employers in Annville include:

 Bear Precision Coatings
 DTS Industries
 JC Tech Industries
 Phillips Diversified Manufacturing
 Senture
 Teleworks USA

Education 
Annville is served by the Jackson County Public School system. 

Schools that serve the community include:
 Tyner Elementary School (K-5)
 Jackson County Middle School (6-8)
 Jackson County High School (9-12)
 Annville Christian Academy (K-12, private)

Demographics 

As of the 2020 census, there were 1,102 people residing in the community. The racial makeup of the city was 97.47% White, 0.24% Hispanic or Latino, 1.93% two or more races, and 0.60% Black or African American. 

The median income for a household in the city was $37,957.  About 26.32% of the population were below the poverty line.

The mean cost for a housing unit was $100,100 while the average rent was $664.

References

Census-designated places in Kentucky
Census-designated places in Jackson County, Kentucky
Populated places disestablished in 2000
Populated places established in 1988